Ordinary People is a 1980 American drama film directed by Robert Redford in his directorial debut. The screenplay by Alvin Sargent is based on the 1976 novel of the same name by Judith Guest. The film follows the disintegration of an upper-middle class family in Lake Forest, Illinois, following the accidental death of one of their two sons and the attempted suicide of the other. It stars Donald Sutherland, Mary Tyler Moore, Judd Hirsch, and Timothy Hutton.

Ordinary People was released theatrically on September 19, 1980, by Paramount Pictures to critical and commercial success. Reviewers praised Redford's direction, Sargent's screenplay, and the performances of the cast. The film, which grossed $90 million on a $6.2 million budget, was chosen by the National Board of Review as one of the top ten films of 1980, and garnered six nominations at the 53rd Academy Awards, winning four: Best Picture, Best Director, Best Adapted Screenplay, and Best Supporting Actor for Hutton (the youngest recipient at age 20). In addition, the film won five awards at the 38th Golden Globe Awards: Best Motion Picture – Drama, Best Director, Best Actress (Moore), Best Screenplay, and Best Supporting Actor (Hutton). Timothy Hutton’s father, actor Jim Hutton died on June 2, 1979 prior to filming. Hutton also thanked his father during the Academy Award speech, which he had won for his role.

Plot
The Jarretts are an upper-middle-class family residing in suburban Chicago. They are trying to return to normal life after experiencing the accidental death of their older teenage son, Buck, and the attempted suicide of their younger and surviving son, Conrad. Conrad has recently returned home after spending four months in a psychiatric hospital. He feels alienated from his friends and family and seeks help from a psychiatrist, Dr. Berger, who discovers that Conrad was involved in the sailing accident that caused Buck's death. Conrad is now dealing with post-traumatic stress disorder and is seeking help to cope with his emotions.

Conrad's father, Calvin, attempts to connect with his surviving son and understand his wife, while Conrad's mother, Beth, denies her loss, hoping to maintain her composure and restore her family to what it once was. She appears to have favored her older son and has grown cold toward Conrad due to his suicide attempt. Beth is determined to maintain the appearance of perfection and normality, and her efforts only serve to alienate Conrad further. Conrad works with Dr. Berger and begins to learn how to deal with his emotions rather than control them. He starts dating a fellow student, Jeannine, who helps him to regain a sense of optimism. However, Conrad still struggles to communicate and establish normal relationships with his parents and schoolmates.

Beth and Conrad often argue while Calvin tries to referee, generally taking Conrad's side for fear of pushing him over the edge again. Tensions escalate near Christmas when Conrad becomes furious at Beth for not wanting to take a photo with him, swearing at her in front of his grandparents. Afterwards, Beth discovers Conrad has been lying about his after-school whereabouts. This leads to a heated confrontation between Conrad and Beth in which Conrad points out that Beth never visited him in the hospital; Conrad argues that if Buck had been hospitalized in his place, she would have gone to see him, to which Beth curtly replies that Buck would never be in the hospital. Beth and Calvin take a trip to see Beth's brother in Houston, where Calvin presses Beth about her evasive attitude.

Conrad suffers a setback when he learns that Karen, a friend from the psychiatric hospital, has committed suicide. A cathartic breakthrough session with Dr. Berger allows Conrad to stop blaming himself for Buck's death and accept his mother's frailties. However, when Conrad tries to show affection, Beth is unresponsive, leading Calvin to emotionally confront her one last time. He questions their love and asks whether she is capable of truly loving anyone. Stunned, Beth packs her bags and goes back to Houston. Calvin and Conrad are left to come to terms with their new family situation, affirming their father-son love for each other.

Cast

 Donald Sutherland as Calvin Jarrett
 Mary Tyler Moore as Beth Jarrett
 Judd Hirsch as Tyrone C. Berger
 Timothy Hutton as Conrad Jarrett
 Elizabeth McGovern as Jeannine Pratt
 M. Emmet Walsh as Salan
 Dinah Manoff as Karen Aldrich
 Fredric Lehne as Joe Lazenby
 James Sikking as Ray Hanley
 Basil Hoffman as Sloan
 Quinn Redeker as Ward
 Mariclare Costello as Audrey
 Meg Mundy as Grandmother
 Elizabeth Hubbard as Ruth
 Adam Baldwin as Kevin Stillman
 Scott Doebler as Buck Jarrett

Casting

Gene Hackman was originally cast as Calvin Jarrett but then later dropped out when he and the studio could not come to a financial agreement.

Release
The film was a box-office success, grossing $54 million in the United States and Canada and approximately $36 million overseas for a worldwide gross of $90 million.

Reception
Ordinary People received critical acclaim. On Rotten Tomatoes, the film has an approval rating of 89%, based on 102 reviews, with an average rating of 8.50/10. The site's critical consensus reads, "Robert Redford proves himself a filmmaker of uncommon emotional intelligence with Ordinary People, an auspicious debut that deftly observes the fractioning of a family unit through a quartet of superb performances."

Roger Ebert gave it a full four stars and praised how the film's setting "is seen with an understated matter-of-factness. There are no cheap shots against suburban lifestyles or affluence or mannerisms: The problems of the people in this movie aren't caused by their milieu, but grow out of themselves. ... That's what sets the film apart from the sophisticated suburban soap opera it could easily have become." He later named it the fifth best film of the year 1980; while colleague Gene Siskel ranked it the second best film of 1980. 

Writing for The New York Times, Vincent Canby called it "a moving, intelligent and funny film about disasters that are commonplace to everyone except the people who experience them."  

The film marked a career breakout for Mary Tyler Moore from the personalities of her other two famous roles: Laura Petrie on The Dick Van Dyke Show and Mary Richards on The Mary Tyler Moore Show. Moore's nuanced portrayal of the mother to Hutton's character was highly acclaimed, and earned her a Best Actress nomination. Donald Sutherland's performance as the father was also well received and earned him a Golden Globe nomination. Despite his co-stars receiving nominations, Sutherland was overlooked for an Academy Award, which Entertainment Weekly has described as one of the biggest acting snubs in the history of the awards.

Judd Hirsch's portrayal of Dr. Berger was a departure from his work on the sitcom Taxi, and drew praise from many in the psychiatric community as one of the rare times their profession is shown in a positive light in film. Hirsch was also nominated for Best Supporting Actor, losing out to co-star Hutton. Additionally, Ordinary People launched the career of Elizabeth McGovern who played Hutton's character's love interest, and who received special permission to film while attending Juilliard.

The film's prominent usage of Pachelbel's Canon, which had been relatively obscure for centuries, helped to usher the piece into mainstream popular culture.

Analysis
Julia L. Hall, a journalist who has written extensively about narcissistic personality disorder, wrote in 2017 upon Moore's death that she "portrays her character's narcissism to a tee in turn after turn." She praised Moore for taking such a career risk so soon after having played such a memorable and likable character on television, "scaffolding gaping emptiness with a persona of perfection, supported by denial, blame, rejection, and rage."

Accolades
Ordinary People won four Oscars for 1980, including the Academy Award for Best Picture. The picture, Robert Redford's debut in directing, won him the Academy Award for Best Director. Alvin Sargent won the Academy Award for Best Adapted Screenplay. Timothy Hutton won the Academy Award for Best Supporting Actor in his first film role (he had previously appeared on television).

Home media 
Ordinary People was released on DVD in 2001. It was released on Blu-ray in March 2022, featuring a 4K restoration of the film.

See also 
 List of directorial debuts
 List of oldest and youngest Academy Award winners and nominees – Youngest winners for Best Actor in a Supporting Role

References

External links

 
 
 
 
 
 

1980 films
1980 drama films
American drama films
Best Drama Picture Golden Globe winners
Best Picture Academy Award winners
1980s English-language films
Films about depression
Films about dysfunctional families
Films about grieving
Films about psychiatry
Films about suicide
Films based on American novels
Films directed by Robert Redford
Films featuring a Best Drama Actress Golden Globe-winning performance
Films featuring a Best Supporting Actor Academy Award-winning performance
Films featuring a Best Supporting Actor Golden Globe winning performance
Films scored by Marvin Hamlisch
Films set in Illinois
Films shot in Illinois
Films whose director won the Best Directing Academy Award
Films whose director won the Best Director Golden Globe
Films whose writer won the Best Adapted Screenplay Academy Award
Lake Forest, Illinois
Paramount Pictures films
Films about post-traumatic stress disorder
Films with screenplays by Alvin Sargent
Fiction about suicide
1980 directorial debut films
Films about father–son relationships
Films about mother–son relationships
1980s American films